Mahmod Mohamad Hejazi (born 19 July 1984) is a Norwegian football striker.

Career
Hejazi is of Palestinian descent. He started his career in Fet IL, but went to regional greats Lillestrøm SK while still a youth player. In 2003, he was regarded as a great talent. He got three Norwegian Premier League game in 2003, without scoring.

In early 2004 he was loaned out to Ullensaker/Kisa IL. He scored twelve goals in nineteen games. After five months however, he was benched for a game, but did not tolerate this, and the loan contract was terminated. Soon after he was released from Lillestrøm.

After this Hejazi moved abroad. He first tried his luck at Pisa Calcio, then played for FC Väsby United in Sweden, where he saw a good deal of success. He made the list of the top ten players in the league compiled by Aftonbladet. The Palestinian national team expressed interest in his services. He later played for Assyriska FF and Finnish FF Jaro. Ahead of the 2007 season he returned to Norway, signing for Lørenskog IF. In 2008, he played for Skjetten SK.

In 2009, he was reported as having left Skjetten for the United Arab Emirates. He joined Manglerud Star in the summer of 2009, and played briefly for them, before joining Nordstrand IF ahead of the 2010 season. In 2011, he joined Flisbyen BK. After one and a half year he went on to Hasle-Løren IL. In 2014, he moved on to Ullern IF.

References

1984 births
Living people
Norwegian footballers
Lillestrøm SK players
Ullensaker/Kisa IL players
AFC Eskilstuna players
FF Jaro players
Skjetten SK players
Lørenskog IF players
Assyriska FF players
Eliteserien players
Veikkausliiga players
Norwegian expatriate footballers
Norwegian expatriate sportspeople in Sweden
Norwegian expatriate sportspeople in Finland
Expatriate footballers in Sweden
Expatriate footballers in Finland
Norwegian people of Palestinian descent
People from Akershus
Association football forwards
Ullern IF players
Lyn Fotball players
Sportspeople from Viken (county)